Reinhard Iselin (4 August 1714 – 10 April 1781) was a Danish merchant, shipowner and industrialist who founded Reinhard Iselin & Co. in Copenhagen in 1749. The company completed 65 expeditions to the Danish West Indies. Iselin was also active in the Danish Asiatic Company where he served on the board of directors from 1759 to 1769. He owned Iselingen and Rosenfeldt at Vordingborg. He was raised to the peerage with the rank of baron in 1776 but the title died with him since both his sons died as infants.

Early life and education
Born in Basel, Iselin was the son of brazier Johan Ludvig Iselin (1676–1745) and his second wife Margaretha Schrotberger (died 1755). Iselin completed an apprenticeship before travelling first to Cologne and then Copenhagen in 1740,

Shipping
In Copenhagen, Iselin initially worked for Fabritius & Wever, a trading house owned by Michael Fabritius.

In 1749 he established his own trading house under the name Reinhard Iselin & Co. which soon grew to be one of the most important in Copenhagen. Iselin was involved in many of the chartered companies of the time and served as director of the Danish Asiatic Company from 1759 to 1769. He was also active in the Danish Africa Company which was founded at the initiative of  Count Johann Hartwig Ernst von Bernstorff. He belonged to the circle of merchants that Bernstorff relied on for state loans.

A stroke forced Icelin to retire from the company in 1777. It was then continued by his wife until her death. The firm owned four ships in 1779. Iselin & Co. completed a total of 65 expeditions to the Danish West Indies.

Ships

Industrial enterprises
Iselin was also involved in several industrial enterprises. In 1754, he was one of the founders of a textile mill and later that same year obtained a royal license to establish a calico textile manufactury at the Christiansholm estate. In 1772, he took over Outerloo's tannery in Adelgade and he also operated a large sugar refinery. Iselin also owned approximately two-fifths of Froland's iron works at Arendal.

Property and honours

He owned Rosendal and Rosenvænget at Copenhagen as well as a country house (now Gramlille) in Kongens Lyngby.

He acquired the estates Iselingen, Rosenfeldt, Snertingegaard and Avnø at Vordingborg from the state when Vordingborg Cavalry District was sold in auction in 1774. In 1776, Iselin was ennobled with the title of baron.

Personal life and legacy
Iselin married his former employer Michael Fabritius' daughter Anna Elisabeth on 2 February 1772 in the German Reformed Church in Copenhagen. They had four children. Their two sons died as infants. Their daughter Marie Margrethe (Mimi) (1753-1814) married Christian Frederik (Friedrich) Ernst Rantzau von Rantzau (1747-1806). Their daughter Lisa married Antoine de Bosc de la Calmette.

Iselin died on 10 April 1781. His widow married Johan Frederik Classen in 1783. In accordance with his wishes, she established two  for their daughters in 1781, Iselingen and Rosenfeldt (named after the family's home town, Rosenfeld in Württemberg). |Anna Elisabeth (née Fabritius) married Antoine de Bosc de la Calmette.

References

External links

 Reinhard Iselin

1714 births
1781 deaths
18th-century Danish businesspeople
18th-century merchants
Danish businesspeople in shipping
Danish manufacturing businesspeople
Danish textile industry businesspeople
Businesspeople from Copenhagen
Danish industrialists
Danish merchants
Naturalised citizens of Denmark
Businesspeople from Basel-Stadt
Swiss emigrants to Denmark
Danish companies established in 1749